KRI Teluk Amboina is a tank landing ship of the Indonesian Navy. The ship was built at Sasebo Heavy Industries, Japan and completed in 1961. Its design is a copy of LST-542-class LST, albeit faster than the original. As of 2020, Teluk Amboina is the oldest ship in commission with the Indonesian Navy.

Characteristics
The ship design is the same as the LST-542-class tank landing ship. The ship is powered by two MAN V6V 22/30 diesel engines, with total power output of  distributed in two shaft.

Teluk Amboina has a capacity of 212 troops,  of cargo, and 4 LCVPs on davits. The ship also able to carry either 610 personnel,  of cargo, 32 jeeps and 18 trucks, or 17 light tanks. She has a complement of 88 personnel and equipped with a 30 ton crane forward of the bridge. Teluk Amboina was initially armed with two 85 mm guns and four 40 mm anti-aircraft guns, and then it was consisted of four 40 mm and an 37 mm anti-aircraft guns. Later she is equipped with six 37 mm anti-aircraft guns in single mount.

Service history
The ship was built by Sasebo Heavy Industries, Sasebo and started construction on 14 October 1960. She was launched on 17 March 1961, then completed and transferred to Indonesian Navy in June 1961. The ship set sail to Indonesia on 6 July 1961 and then formally commissioned on 2 August 1961, assigned with pennant number 869.

In late 1961 until mid 1962, Teluk Amboina took part in Operation Trikora, a planned operation to seize and annex Netherlands New Guinea.

She also participated in Operation Seroja, the invasion of East Timor to oust Fretilin regime. Teluk Amboina departed Surabaya for Dili on 6 December at 18:30 UTC+7 carrying 226 troops, 5 PT-76 amphibious tanks, 8 BTR-50 amphibious APCs, 2  amphibious vehicles, 14 BM-14-17 rocket artillery and 4 ZIL-164 trucks.

Aside from its primary purpose as amphibious warfare ship, Teluk Amboina also carried out other duties such as transporting troops and materials to and from Indonesian borders with Malaysia and East Timor. It also transport troops, materials and vehicles of the Security of Prone Area Task Force (Satgas Pamrahwan) to Maluku and North Maluku.

In the aftermath of 2004 Indian Ocean earthquake and tsunami, Teluk Amboina distributed foods and waters, clothes, tarpaulins, toiletries, fuels, medicines and body bags to the West Aceh Regency areas. She also took part in relief efforts after 2018 Lombok earthquake, transporting personnel and materials from the 12th Construction Engineers Battalion "Karana Jaya" of the Indonesian Army Corps of Engineers to participate in Quick Response Task Force for Disaster Management in Lombok. The ship departed Tanjung Priok on 23 September 2018.

On 17 March 2020, the ship's crews commemorate the 59th anniversary of KRI Teluk Amboina since it was launched in 1961. The simple event was also attended by the Commander of the Jakarta Military Sealift Unit.

On 9 April 2020 at 14:40 UTC+7, Teluk Amboina caught on fire while docked at Pier 9 on Kolinlamil Headquarters in Tanjung Priok. The first firefighters from Sector II Koja Fire Station arrived on 14:45. In total 11 fire engines were deployed and the firefighting efforts was concluded on 16:13. The preliminary speculation is that the fire was caused by welding works. In early July, the ship undergo maintenance at Port of Tanjung Emas, Semarang.

References

External links

 KRI Teluk Amboina — 503 — Koarmada II — TNI AL (in Indonesian)

Ships built by Sasebo Naval Arsenal
1961 ships
LST-542-class tank landing ships of the Indonesian Navy
Amphibious warfare vessels of the Indonesian Navy